Seyyed Fazel (also Romanized as Seyyed Fāẕel) is a village in Allah-o Akbar Rural District, in the Central District of Dasht-e Azadegan County, Khuzestan Province, Iran. At the 2006 census, its population was 59, in 13 families.

References 

Populated places in Dasht-e Azadegan County